Eupen dialect is the dialect spoken in the city Eupen.

Classification 
The Eupener dialect is part of a dialect continuum between Limburgish and Ripuarian. While Limburgish dialects are considered Low Franconian (like well as Dutch), Ripuarian is considered to be West Central German.

Geographic distribution 
Today, it is used less than other similar dialects in adjacent municipalities, like the dialects of Welkenraedt, Gemmenich or Montzen east of Eupen. The younger residents of Eupen tend to speak Standard German instead. West of Eupen, Wallonian dialects of French are spoken.

Status 
As the Eupen dialect is used by the German minority in Belgium, it is considered to be a dialect of German just like Ripuarian.

Linguistic features 

Nouns are always capitalized, following German conventions.

References

Bibliography
 
 
 

Central German languages
German dialects
German-speaking Community of Belgium
Ripuarian language
City colloquials